Seven Oaks is an unincorporated community in Anne Arundel County, Maryland, United States. Though it is included in the census-designated place of Odenton, it lies across from Fort Meade and the NSA, and is more a part of those communities .

The neighborhood includes a nature reserve, elementary school, community center with outdoor pool, fitness center, tennis courts, basketball court, second smaller pool on the opposite side of the community, daycare center and small shopping center. Seven Oaks has single family homes, town homes, apartments, and duplex homes.

The Base Realignment and Closure, 2005 plan was expected to bring about 700 families to Seven Oaks.

Education
The Seven Oaks area is served by the following schools:

 Seven Oaks Elementary School
 MacArthur Middle School (Fort Meade)
 Meade High School (Fort Meade)

References

External links
 
 Seven Oaks Community website
 Elected officials for people living in Seven Oaks

Unincorporated communities in Anne Arundel County, Maryland
Unincorporated communities in Maryland
Odenton, Maryland